The pale thrush (Turdus pallidus) is a passerine bird of the eastern Palearctic belonging to the genus Turdus in the thrush family Turdidae. It is closely related to the eye-browed thrush and grey-backed thrush.

It is 23 cm long. The feet are pale pinkish-brown and the bill is grey above and yellow below. The male is brown above with a blue-grey head and throat. The underparts are pale brown, darker on the flanks and whitish on the belly and undertail-coverts. The flight feathers of the wing are dark grey and the underwing-coverts are grey or white. The tail is dark grey with white tips to the outer feathers. The female is similar to the male but duller with a browner head and pale throat.

It has harsh chuck-chuck and see-ip calls and a bubbling alarm call.

It breeds in south-east Siberia, north-east China and Korea and may breed in Japan, especially on Tsushima Island. It is largely migratory, wintering in southern and central Japan, South Korea and southern China, occasionally reaching as far as Yunnan, Taiwan and the Philippines. It inhabits forests, scrub, gardens and parks. It is a shy bird which keeps to cover. It can occur in large flocks on migration, particularly where there are berries.

References

Brazil, Mark A. (1991) The Birds of Japan. Christopher Helm, London.
Lee, Woo-Shin, Koo, Tae-Hoe & Park, Jin-Young (2000) A Field Guide to the Birds of Korea. LG Evergreen Foundation, Seoul.
MacKinnon, John & Phillipps, Karen (2000) A Field Guide to the Birds of China. Oxford University Press, Oxford.

External links

Oriental Bird Images: Pale Thrush

pale thrush
Thrushes
Birds of Manchuria
Birds of Korea
Fauna of Siberia
pale thrush
pale thrush